Chicago Union Station is an intercity and commuter rail terminal located in the Near West Side neighborhood of Chicago, Illinois. The station is Amtrak's flagship station in the Midwest. While serving long-distance passenger trains, it is also the downtown terminus for six Metra commuter lines. The station is just west of the Chicago River between West Adams Street and West Jackson Boulevard, adjacent to the Chicago Loop. Including approach and storage tracks, it covers about nine and a half city blocks (mostly underground, buried beneath streets and skyscrapers).

The present Chicago Union Station opened in 1925, replacing an earlier station on this site built in 1881. The station is the fourth-busiest rail station in the United States, after Pennsylvania Station, Grand Central Terminal, and Jamaica station in New York City. It is Amtrak's overall fourth-busiest station, and the busiest outside of its Northeast Corridor. It handles about 140,000 passengers on an average weekday (including 10,000 Amtrak passengers) and is one of Chicago's most iconic structures, reflecting the city's strong architectural heritage and historic achievements. It has Bedford limestone Beaux-Arts facades, massive Corinthian columns, marble floors, and a Great Hall, all highlighted by brass lamps.

Chicago Union Station provides direct connections to multiple transit authorities including the Chicago Transit Authority bus and Chicago L lines, Metra, Pace, Greyhound, and more within the station or within walking distance.

Name
Chicago Union Station is named a union station, like many train stations across the United States that were shared by several railroad companies. The station is the third union station to occupy the site between West Adams Street and West Jackson Boulevard. The station is known by the acronym CUS, as well as by its Amtrak station code CHI.

Location
Chicago Union Station is situated in the West Loop Gate neighborhood of the Near West Side of Chicago, just west of Chicago's Loop. The station's underground concourse and train sheds abut the Chicago River; passageways extend west beneath Canal Street to the main station building, one block over.

Services

Amtrak

Blue Water (Chicago – Port Huron, Michigan)
California Zephyr (Chicago – Emeryville)
Capitol Limited (Chicago – Washington DC)
Cardinal (Chicago – New York)
City of New Orleans (Chicago – New Orleans)
Empire Builder (Chicago – Portland/Seattle)
Hiawatha Service (Chicago – Milwaukee)
Illini and Saluki (Chicago – Carbondale, Illinois)
Illinois Zephyr and Carl Sandburg (Chicago – Quincy)
Lake Shore Limited (Chicago – New York/Boston)
Lincoln Service (Chicago – St. Louis)
Pere Marquette (Chicago – Grand Rapids)
Southwest Chief (Chicago – Los Angeles)
Texas Eagle (Chicago – San Antonio/Los Angeles)
Wolverine (Chicago – Pontiac)

Metra

 BNSF Line
 Heritage Corridor
 Milwaukee District North Line
 Milwaukee District West Line
 North Central Service
 SouthWest Service

Connections

Local rail service
Unlike many major American intercity and commuter rail hubs, Union Station does not have any direct connection to local rapid transit service. However, two Chicago "L" stations are within walking distance of Union Station.

 (two blocks south of the station):  

Metra's other three downtown terminals – the Ogilvie Transportation Center, LaSalle Street Station and Millennium Station – are all within walking distance of Union Station. Passengers connecting from Ogilvie can access Union Station's north platforms on the opposite side of Madison Street.

Bus service

Numerous CTA bus routes stop directly at Union Station:

 Union Station Transit Center: 1, 28, 121, 124, 128, 151, 156
 West side of Clinton, north side of block: 125, 130, 192
 West side of Clinton, south side of block: 7, 60, 157
 Southwest corner of Clinton/Jackson: 126, 754, 755 (Pace)

Union Station Transit Center is located adjacent to Union Station's parking garage. The bus station opened in 2016, on land formerly used for a surface parking lot. It features an elevator and stairway to the Amtrak underground pedestrian tunnel, allowing commuters to pass between Union Station and the bus staging area without crossing at street level.

Union Station has a counter operated by the Greyhound intercity bus company. Tickets are available for purchase, and some Greyhound and Megabus buses pick up passengers on South Canal Street, on the east side of the station building. The full-service Greyhound station is four blocks southwest of Union Station.

Historical services 

Union Station was served by lines in all directions even before Penn Central and Amtrak consolidated the downtown terminals. The station served as a terminal for the following railroads:
Chicago and Alton Railroad – only a tenant, later part of the Gulf, Mobile and Ohio Railroad
Chicago, Burlington and Quincy Railroad (Burlington Route)
Chicago, Milwaukee, St. Paul and Pacific Railroad (Milwaukee Road) – The station housed its corporate offices from 1924 to 1986
Pittsburgh, Fort Wayne and Chicago Railway (PRR)
Pittsburgh, Cincinnati, Chicago and St. Louis Railroad (Panhandle) (moved to use the PFW&C approach after April 23, 1917)
Penn Central Transportation Company (former services of the New York Central Railroad and Michigan Central Railroad) (moved from LaSalle Street Station October 27, 1968)
Amtrak (began May 1, 1971, moved from Dearborn Station May 2, 1971 and Central Station March 6, 1972 (Floridian moved January 23, 1972); Amtrak's Calumet and Indiana Connection commuter trains also ran into Union Station)

Some of these trains and their names have survived to present Amtrak services, such as the Empire Builder, the California Zephyr, and the Hiawatha.

The name Ann Rutledge was used by Amtrak as a Chicago-St. Louis-Kansas City route until a name and service consolidation in 2009. There is also a Lincoln Service that operates in Illinois.

Interior

Station building

Located west of Canal Street, Union Station's station building occupies an entire city block. At its center is the Great Hall, the main waiting room. Arrayed around the Great Hall are numerous smaller spaces containing restaurants and services, and a wide passageway leading to the concourse. Above the main floor are several floors of office space, currently used by Amtrak. Original plans called for many more floors of offices, forming a skyscraper above the Great Hall. This was never completed, although the plan has been revived in recent years.

The Burlington Room is an event space at the northwest of the Great Hall. The room features large columns, chandeliers, four French block murals of landscape scenery, and an original mirror. The space, initially a women's lounge, was restored in November 2016, after years of damage and neglect. For event uses, the space has color-changing lights and an audiovisual system.

The headhouse includes a space formerly used as a Fred Harvey restaurant. After a large fire in 1980, the space was damaged, windows on Clinton Street were destroyed, and the space was left vacant since then. In 2018, Amtrak announced plans to redevelop the space into a multi-level food hall, using funds from the sale of its parking garage. A new entrance and canopy would be installed on Clinton Street, and new windows would replace the bricked-up windows. The food hall was planned to open in the summer of 2020.

The headhouse also includes a Metropolitan Lounge, one of seven Amtrak offers in its stations. The lounge operates like an airport lounge, accessible to business- and first-class passengers, as well as other high-price ticketed passengers. The lounge reopened in June 2016, moving from the concourse to the headhouse. It features different seating areas intended for businesspeople, families and children, and people using phones or tablets. The space has bathrooms with showers, and an elevator.

Platforms and tracks
Union Station is laid out with a double stub-end configuration, with 10 tracks coming into the station from the north and 14 from the south. Unlike most of Amtrak's major stations, every train calling at Union Station either originates or terminates there; all passengers traveling through Chicago must change trains to reach their final destination. There are two through tracks to allow out-of-service equipment moves between the north and south side, including one with a platform to allow extra long trains to board. Between the north and south sides of the station is a passenger concourse. Passengers can walk through the concourse to get from any platform to any other without stairs or elevators. Odd-numbered platforms (1–19) are on the north half of the station, and even-numbered platforms (2–30) on the south half. The north tracks are used by Amtrak for the Hiawatha Service and the Empire Builder, and by Metra for the Milwaukee District West, Milwaukee District North, and North Central Service routes. The south tracks are used for all other Amtrak services, as well as by Metra for the BNSF, Heritage Corridor and SouthWest Services. Two station management structures (known as glasshouses), one on each side of the terminal, monitor train-to-track assignments and the flow of traffic in and out of the station. Actual oversight and control of switching and signalling is accomplished by two "train director" positions, one for each side of the station, located in the Amtrak control center in the station's headhouse.

Numerous entrances provide access to Union Station's underground platform level. The main entrance is on Canal Street opposite the headhouse, but passengers can also reach the platforms directly from the headhouse via an underground passageway. Two secondary entrances are located in Riverside Plaza near the Jackson Boulevard and Adams Street bridges. On Madison Street, across the street, and one block east from Ogilvie Transportation Center, are a set of entrances to the north platforms.

Architecture

Union Station was designed by D. H. Burnham & Company (known for its lead architect Daniel Burnham, who died before construction began). The successor firm of Graham, Anderson, Probst and White completed the work. The terminal was among the first to anticipate automobile traffic; it was first designed in 1909, one year after the Model T entered production. It was designed with ticket offices, concourses, platforms, waiting and baggage rooms, and shops, all on a single level, meant to be easy to navigate. At opening, the terminal also housed a hospital, chapel, and jail cell.

The main building, a square Neoclassical structure, takes up one city block. Its architectural style contrasts with modern glass-faced buildings around it. The station has wide porticos and large colonnades on its exterior. The street-level entrances utilize Indiana limestone.

The station featured a large concourse along the river, made with marble, glass, and iron. Massive steel arches held up the roof, and several stairways led passengers down to the platforms.

Great Hall
At the building's center is the Great Hall, a -high atrium capped by a large barrel-vaulted skylight. The  room has connecting lobbies, staircases, and balconies. Enormous wooden benches are arranged in the room for travelers to wait for connections, and two specially-designed underground taxicab drives were built to protect travelers from the weather. The room's columns are of textured Roman travertine marble, with leafy golden Corinthian capitals. The ceilings and insets are coffered, with decorative rosettes.

Two statues by Henry Hering —Night and Day — look down on passengers, symbolizing the 24-hour operation of the railroads. The statue Night holds an owl, while Day holds a rooster.

Related structures

Power station

The Chicago Union Station Power House is a decommissioned coal-fire power plant that provided power to Union Station and its surrounding infrastructure. Located on the Chicago River, north of Roosevelt Road, it was designed in the Art Moderne style by Graham, Anderson, Probst and White in 1931. The power plant was decommissioned in 2011. It was included in Preservation Chicago's 7 Most Endangered list in 2017 and 2020, as Amtrak has plans to demolish the building.

Post office
The same architecture firm that designed Union Station also designed the Old Chicago Main Post Office, a post office atop the station's southern tracks. The post office, opened four years before Union Station, utilized the rail system, funneling mail to and from the trains below. An expansion in 1932 made the structure the world's largest post office.

Construction over the station's train shed

The large amount of land above the tracks and platforms has tempted property owners and developers. Possibly inspired by Terminal City, a development built atop New York's Grand Central Terminal's train shed, Chicago moved to develop the air rights above Union Station's tracks. The first building to be built was that of the Chicago Daily News in 1929. Designed in the Art Deco style, it was the first structure to add a public promenade along the river, which would be named Riverside Plaza. Soon after, in 1932, the new Chicago Main Post Office opened. Also in the Art Deco style, it is a gigantic structure that occupies two full city blocks. The Great Depression and subsequent World War II halted development, but in the 1960s, work began on Gateway Center, a Modernist complex of five buildings. Only the first four were built, and construction lasted into the 1980s through several economic cycles.

In 1990 the Morton International Building opened. Now named for Boeing, it is the tallest building yet to be constructed over the tracks. With the construction of River Point beginning in 2013 and 150 North Riverside beginning in 2014, the entire length of the train shed and tracks from Union Station north to Fulton Street and south to Polk Street is enclosed by overhead development.

Chicago Union Station's train shed, covered by buildings built above the tracks, helped lead locomotives to funnel significant soot and smoke in and around the station. This was unlike Grand Central Terminal, which has only allowed electric trains into its trainshed since opening.

History
The current Union Station is the second by that name built in Chicago, and possibly the third rail station to occupy the site. The need for a single, centralized station was an important political topic in 19th and 20th-century Chicago, as various competing railroads had built a series of terminal stations. The numerous stations and associated railyards and tracks surrounded the city's central business district, the Loop, and threatened its expansion. The various stations also made travel difficult for through-travelers, many of whom had to make inconvenient transfers often slowed by street traffic from one station to another through the Loop. Union Station was part of architect Daniel Burnham's city-wide Plan of Chicago in 1909.

Predecessors

On December 25, 1858, the Pittsburgh, Fort Wayne and Chicago Railroad opened as far as Van Buren Street in Chicago. It built the first station at what would eventually become today's Union Station on the west bank of the Chicago River.

The railroad built a permanent depot at the corner of Canal and Madison streets in 1861.

On April 7, 1874 five railroads agreed to build and share a union station just north of the original Pittsburgh, Fort Wayne, and Chicago Railroad station site at Van Buren Street. These railroads were:
Pennsylvania Company (a subsidiary of the Pennsylvania Railroad)
Chicago, Burlington and Quincy Railroad (Burlington Route)
Michigan Central Railroad
Chicago and Alton Railroad
Chicago, Milwaukee and St. Paul Railway (The Milwaukee Road)

The Michigan Central, which had previously been using the Illinois Central Railroad's Great Central Station, soon decided to back out of the agreement, and continued to use the Illinois Central Depot. The Chicago and North Western Railway, not part of the original agreement, considered switching to the new station from its Wells Street Station but deferred instead. In 1911 it built the Chicago and North Western Passenger Terminal for its operations.

The remaining four original companies used the station when it opened in 1881. The headhouse of the Union Depot, a narrow building, fronted onto Canal Street and stretched from Madison Street to Adams Street. Tracks led into the station from the south, and platforms occupied a strip of land between the back of the headhouse and the bank of the Chicago River. South of the station, Adams, Jackson, and Van Buren Streets rose over the tracks and the river on bridges. The station, along with its successor, was effectively two back-to-back stub-end terminals. Virtually all trains arriving would terminate there, and passengers traveling further would need to change trains.

Replacement

Growth in passenger traffic, as well as a civic push to consolidate numerous railroad terminals, led to a proposal for an enlarged Union Station on the same site. The second Union Station would be built by the Chicago Union Station Company. This was a new company formed by all the railroads that had used the first station, save for the Chicago and Alton, which became a tenant in the new station. The Pennsylvania Railroad, then the U.S.'s largest railroad company, planned and directed the project.

The architectural firm was D. H. Burnham & Company (known for its lead architect Daniel Burnham, who died before construction began). The successor firm of Graham, Anderson, Probst and White completed the work. Work began on the massive project in 1913, and required purchasing adjacent properties and moving freight facilities. Construction stalled during World War I, and resumed in 1919. The station finally opened on May 16, 1925, twelve years after construction began; some viaduct work continued into 1927. The construction cost, funded by the railroad companies involved, was projected to be $65 million, but ended up costing $75 million. Construction was delayed several times by World War I, labor shortages and strikes. The construction of the station also involved the demolition and relocation of some previously existing buildings such as the Butler Brothers Warehouse along the Chicago River. It is one of about a dozen monumental Beaux-Arts railroad stations that were among the most complicated architectural programs of the era called the "American Renaissance", combining traditional architecture with engineering technology, circulation patterning and urban planning. Union Station was hailed as an outstanding achievement in railroad facility planning at the time.

Wartime, decline, and resurgence
During World War II, Union Station was at its busiest, handling as many as 300 trains and 100,000 passengers daily, many of them soldiers. Illustrator Norman Rockwell captured this era with his cover painting for a December 1944 issue of The Saturday Evening Post, depicting the station jammed with Christmas travelers. After the war, the growth of highway construction and private ownership of automobiles caused a severe decline in American passenger-rail ridership, including at Union Station.

In 1969, the station's owner demolished the concourse building, making way for a modern office tower. A new and modernized, though less grand, concourse was constructed beneath the tower. In May 1971, the national railroad Amtrak was formed to take over long-distance passenger train service, while commuter trains remained privately operated. In 1980, the station's Fred Harvey restaurant experienced a large fire. The space was damaged, windows on Clinton Street were destroyed, and the space was left vacant since then.

In 1984, Amtrak bought out the shares of Chicago Union Station Company held by Burlington Northern (successor to the Burlington Route) and the Milwaukee Road, becoming sole owner of the station.

In the 1990s, Lucien Lagrange Associates made some patchwork renovations, including to the Great Hall and its skylight, which had been blacked-out since World War II. Restoration of Union Station continued. Numerous spaces within the station had yet to be renovated, and many sat unused, especially within the station building.

21st century
After the September 11, 2001 attacks, Amtrak closed the pair of taxicab drives in the name of security. Passenger traffic has increased and is exceeding the design capacity of the 1991 renovation. On May 1, 2002, the station was designated a Chicago Landmark, protecting its exterior, rooflines, and public interior spaces from alterations. The status protects all exteriors, rooflines, the central lightwell, vehicular drives, the Great Hall, skylight, and select interior features – balconies, porticos, corridors, lobbies, and stairs.

In 2010, Amtrak (the current owners of the Chicago Union Station Company) announced plans to air-condition the Great Hall for the first time since the 1960s. That year a Chicago Tribune investigation revealed high levels of diesel soot on the underground platforms of Union Station. Metra established an "Emissions Task Force" to study this problem and recommend solutions to improve air quality in the underground areas.  In 2011, its lighting system was replaced with more energy-efficient light bulbs and motion sensors, reducing the station's annual carbon emissions by 4 million tons. Custom steel lighting covers were added to top these safety/light towers, helping them blend in with the overall neoclassical style of the station.

In 2011, the city held a public meeting to discuss goals for the station, aiming to accommodate the expected 40 percent growth in passengers by 2040. In the following year, city agencies joined together to publish a master plan for renovating and improving Union Station. Short-term goals were to improve station entrances and expand waiting rooms, as well as enhance bus lanes on Clinton and Canal Streets and create a bus terminal (completed in 2016). Goals for the next five to ten years included widening commuter platforms, using unutilized mail platforms (including an extra-long through platform) for intercity passenger trains, adding more through tracks and platforms, reorganizing facilities for better capacity and flow, increasing height clearances of the tracks, and improving street access to and from the station. Long-term, proposals include increasing capacity and improving the ambiance of the station by significantly expanding or replacing station facilities in the 200 or 300 blocks of South Canal Street. Adding track and platform capacity along Clinton Street or Canal Street was also analyzed.

In June 2015, Amtrak announced that it would renovate the station, including opening up long-closed spaces and replacing the worn staircases with marble from the original quarry near Rome. In 2016, the women's lounge was restored, renamed the Burlington Room, and opened for use as an events space. The space was initially a women's lounge, and later became an Amtrak warehouse. It then suffered years of neglect and water damage, and was eventually closed off. In November 2016, the room was renovated and reopened. An architecture firm removed wooden decking that divided the space into two floors, and took out a drop ceiling that defaced the original ornate ceiling. The work restored the room's columns and chandeliers, including creating several replica chandeliers. The room also has four French block murals of landscape scenery; three of the four were cleaned and preserved, while the fourth was reproduced. An original mirror and banister were added to the room's north end. The space was improved for events with color-changing lights and an audiovisual system.

In 2016, Amtrak held a competition for renovations and development of Union Station. The winner, Riverside Investment & Development Co., proposed multiple changes, including new retail, a food hall, and two 12-story towers. The plans followed an unrealized 2007 plan for a tower addition above Union Station.

From 2018 to 2019, a $22 million restoration of the Great Hall, including restoring original detailing and rebuilding the large skylight, was completed, increasing natural light by 50 to 60 percent. The skylight, originally built in the 1920s, suffered from decades of harsh weather, leading to countless patchwork repairs, many of which blocked light from entering the Great Hall. The 2018–19 renovation restored the historic skylight to its original appearance, and added another glass skylight atop it. The new skylight is better-designed to prevent water and snow damage, and increases light entering the Great Hall.

In 2018, Riverside Investment & Development Co. released a revised plan that included a seven-story addition above Union Station, adding 404 apartments to the building. The planned design was created by Solomon Cordwell Buenz, resembling Burnham's earlier proposed tower above the station, designed to handle the weight. The addition was to be clad in glass and light bronze, differentiated from the station's design as recommended in its landmark designation. The developers also planned to renovate the existing upper levels of Union Station's headhouse, adding 330 hotel rooms. The proposal was met with mixed reactions by preservationists and architectural critics, with Blair Kamin, the Chicago Tribunes critic, calling it "banal" and "top-heavy". Several months later, the developers announced they were cancelling the plan for the seven-story addition, instead constructing only a single additional penthouse floor, set back to not be visible from the street. The revised plan kept hotel rooms in the station's upper floors, and added a proposed 50-story office tower replacing the station's underutilized parking garage.

In 2018, Amtrak announced plans to redevelop the former Fred Harvey restaurant space into a multi-level food hall, using funds from the sale of its parking garage. A new entrance and canopy would be installed on Clinton Street, and new windows would replace the bricked-up windows. The food hall was planned to open in the summer of 2020.

In September 2019, Union Station's 700-car parking garage permanently closed in order to be demolished. The skyscraper includes a  park above 400 parking spaces. The construction will not affect the pedway from the terminal to its adjacent Union Station Transit Center.

In March 2020, U.S. Representative for Illinois Dan Lipinski filed a bill to shift operational control of the terminal from Amtrak to Metra. Lipinski noted that Metra utilizes the station much more than Amtrak does, and operates its other large stations more effectively than Amtrak operates Union Station. Amtrak officials threatened to stop service to Union Station if the change is to be made, stating it would be impossible to operate and would serve as a blockade to regional and national Amtrak service. Congress was out of session during the COVID-19 pandemic, and aimed to discuss Lipinski's bill once sessions resumed.

In popular culture 

Union Station is used as a filming location in television and movies. Films in which the station appears include The Sting (1973), Silver Streak (1976), On the Right Track (1981), Doctor Detroit (1983), The Untouchables (1987), My Best Friend's Wedding (1997), Flags of Our Fathers (2006),  Public Enemies (2009), and Man of Steel (2013). It was also featured in Season 4, Episode 8 of the TV series Fargo (2020), although it was depicted as Kansas City Union Station. A 2016 exhibit in Union Station showcased the station and Chicago's use as a filming location in American cinema.

Amtrak ridership statistics

Between the fiscal years 2002 and 2008, Amtrak ridership more than doubled at the station, surpassing 3.1 million in the 2008 fiscal year.

The following is the top-ten stations which receive the most ridership to/from Chicago Union Station out of the 265 that Amtrak rail services that directly connected with Chicago Union Station as of 2019:

Metra ridership statistics

Cumulative ridership

See also
 Architecture of Chicago
 History of passenger rail in Chicago
 List of busiest railway stations in North America
 Illinois Service
 Missouri River Runner

References

External links

Chicago Union Station – Metra

1925 establishments in Illinois
Amtrak stations in Illinois
Amtrak Thruway Motorcoach stations in Illinois
Former Chicago and Alton Railroad stations
Former Chicago, Burlington and Quincy Railroad stations
Former Chicago, Milwaukee, St. Paul and Pacific Railroad stations
Former Pennsylvania Railroad stations
Union Station
Union Station
Union Station
Railway stations located underground in Illinois
Railway stations in the United States opened in 1925
Transit centers in the United States
Union stations in the United States